Shinichi Sato or Shin'ichi Satō may refer to:

, Japanese baseball player
, Japanese footballer
, Japanese shogi player